Hearts most commonly refers to:
 Hearts (card game), a trick-taking game
 Hearts (suit), one of the standard four suits of cards
 Heart, an organ

Hearts may also refer to:

Music
 The Hearts, an American girl group closely related to the Jaynetts

Albums
 Hearts (America album)
 Hearts (I Break Horses album)
 Hearts, an album by Lenny

Songs
 "Hearts" (song), a 1981 song by Marty Balin
 "Hearts", a 1983 song by Yes from 90125

Sports
 Auckland Hearts, a New Zealand women's cricket team
 Buchanhaven Hearts F.C., a Scottish football club based in Aberdeenshire
 Buncrana Hearts F.C., an association football club based in the Inishowen peninsula, County Donegal, Northern Ireland
 Heart of Midlothian F.C., a Scottish football club based in Edinburgh
 Kelty Hearts F.C., a Scottish football club based in Fife
 Kennoway Star Hearts J.F.C., a Scottish football club based in Fife

Other uses
 Microsoft Hearts, a computer implementation of the card game
 Heart (symbol) or ♥, a symbol representing love, the organ, or a card suit

See also 
Hart (disambiguation)
Heart (disambiguation)